is a city in Kagawa Prefecture, Japan.

Geography
Sanuki is located in northeast Ehime Prefecture, on the island of Shikoku, facing the Seto Inland Sea to the north, and the Sanuki Mountains to the south. The city lies just east of the prefecture capital, Takamatsu.

Neighbouring municipalities 
Kagawa Prefecture
Takamatsu
Higashikagawa
Miki
Tokushima Prefecture
Mima
 Awa

Climate
Sanuki has a Humid subtropical climate (Köppen Cfa) characterized by warm summers and cool winters with light snowfall.  The average annual temperature in Sanuki is 15.5 °C. The average annual rainfall is 1606 mm with September as the wettest month. The temperatures are highest on average in January, at around 26.3 °C, and lowest in January, at around 5.3 °C.

Demographics
Per Japanese census data, the population of Sanuki has been relatively steady since the 1960s.

History 
The area of Sanuki was part of ancient Sanuki Province and has been inhabited since ancient times, with many kofun burial mounds found within the city limits. During the Edo Period, the area was part of the territories of Takamatsu Domain.  Following the Meiji restoration, out became part of Sangawa District, Ehime Prefecture in 1878, which became part of Kagawa Prefecture in 1888.   The village of Shido was established with the creation of the modern municipalities system on February 15,1890, and was elevated to town status on February 11, 1898. The area became part of Ōkawa District, Kagawa in 1899. The city of Sanuki was created in 2002 by merging Shido with the neighboring town of Tsuda, Nagao, Sangawa and Ōkawa.

Government
Sanuki has a mayor-council form of government with a directly elected mayor and a unicameral city council of 20 members. Sanuki contributes two members to the Ehime Prefectural Assembly. In terms of national politics, the city is in the Kagawa 2nd district of the lower house of the Diet of Japan.

Economy
Sanuki has a mixed economy centered on agriculture and manufacturing, with a number of industrial parks .

Education
Sanuki has seven public elementary schools and three public middle schools operated by the city government, and three public high schools operated by the Ehime Prefectural Board of Education. In addition, there is one private high school.

Transportation

Railways 
 JR Shikoku - Kōtoku Line
  -  -  -  -  - 
 Takamatsu-Kotohira Electric Railroad - Nagao Line
 
 Takamatsu-Kotohira Electric Railroad - Shido Line

Highways 
  Takamatsu Expressway

Sister city relations
 - Eisenstadt, Austria, since October 11, 1993

Local attractions
Shido-ji, 86th temple in the Shikoku Pilgrimage
 Nagao-ji, 87th temple in the Shikoku Pilgrimage, which holds Shamisen-mochitsuki, an annual New Year's event on January 2. 
Ōkubo-ji, 88th and final temple in the Shikoku Pilgrimage
Tsuda Kofun Cluster, National Historic Site
Tomida Chausuyama Kofun, National Historic Site

Gallery

References

External links 
  

Cities in Kagawa Prefecture
 
Populated coastal places in Japan